CVD may refer to:

Medicine
 Cardiovascular disease
 Cerebrovascular disease
 Color vision deficiency, also known as color blindness

Technology
 Chemical vapor deposition
 CVD diamond, produced by chemical vapor deposition
 China Video Disc, a CD-based video format
 Coordinated vulnerability disclosure, a computer-security practice

Other uses
 Countervailing duties or anti-subsidy duties
 Card Verification Data or Card Verification Value, for payment cards